Akbarabad (also Romanized as Akbarābād) is a village in Rudboneh Rural District, Rudboneh District, Lahijan County, Gilan Province, Iran. At the 2006 census, its population was 691, in 225 families.

References 

Populated places in Lahijan County